WSPK (104.7 FM, "K-104") is a contemporary hit radio (CHR) station licensed to Poughkeepsie, New York. Its studios are located on NY 52 Business in the town of Fishkill (with a Beacon address). It is owned by Pamal Broadcasting and transmits from a tower atop Beacon Mountain in Fishkill.

WSPK's main coverage area is centered on the Mid-Hudson Valley, with secondary targeting into the eastern Catskills; Northern Westchester County; the Danbury, Connecticut area; Sussex County, New Jersey; and Pike County, Pennsylvania. For many years, the station's top-of-hour ID mentioned its coverage of parts of five states (New York, New Jersey, Pennsylvania, Connecticut, Massachusetts) and "an itty-bitty piece of Vermont." WSPK reaches the Bronx and, until the launch of stations at adjacent frequencies in the early 1990s, Albany as well.  In recent years illegal pirate broadcasters have begun broadcasting on 104.7 in the Bronx and Brooklyn which interfere with K-104's signal in Southern Westchester and the Bronx where the station used to be listenable all the time.

History
Poughkeepsie Newspaper Incorporated, then owner of WKIP, signed on WHVA 104.7 MHz on December 7, 1947. It was the first FM station to sign on between New York City and the Albany area. The transmitter site was located on North Mount Beacon in an area that was mainly a bungalow colony above the Mount Beacon Incline Railway and casino.  The building and tower had been previously used by WOKO in the late 1920s.  While that site did not work well for AM radio because of the poor ground conductivity, it proved an excellent site for FM radio due to its height advantages.

In its early years, the station played classical music and for a time was a part of a regional network operated by station WQXR. In 1950, WHVA was sold to the Rural Radio Network, which later was renamed the "Northeast Radio Network".  The call sign was changed to WRRH. In June 1953, WRRH was sold to Dutchess Broadcasting Corporation, owners of WKIP.  This would make the second time the station was co-owned with WKIP. The call letters were changed to WKIP-FM and the station adopted a full-time simulcast of WKIP's full service format.

In 1968 WKIP-FM added stereo capabilities and split off from its AM sister station with a Top 40 format.

In 1970 WKIP-FM was sold to Beacon Broadcasting, owner of WBNR,  and took on new call letters: WSPK (Stereo Poughkeepsie). With new owners came a 60% simulcast with WBNR that created a varied middle of the road/classical/beautiful music format which was commonplace on many FM stations at the time.  The new owners also chose an unusual identifier for an FM frequency: 10-47 (said on-air as "ten-forty-seven").

By 1972, the station changed to a country music format to counter the newly relaunched WPDH. Country did not last long on the frequency and in the fall of 1974, WSPK adopted a Top 40 format under the moniker "10-47, More Music!", which ran from the fall of 1974 to early 1977. During this period, WSPK simulcast the WBNR morning show hosted by Rick Liotta. The station also simulcast with WBNR on the weekends, breaking away for network newscasts on the half-hour and when WBNR ran Yankees baseball, WSPK played pre-recorded oldies tapes voiced by Liotta. The national radio show American Top 40 with Casey Kasem also debuted during this time; WKNY in Kingston would become the regional affiliate, however, through the 1980s as WPLJ took AT40 following its July 1983 switch to Top 40. At the time the 95.5 MHz reached much of the mid-Hudson Valley thanks to FM via cablevision.

In the spring of 1977, WSPK again went after WPDH which had flipped from country to automated album-oriented rock (AOR) a year earlier with instant ratings success. WSPK's AOR format concentrated on quieter tracks than PDH's approach and struggled as WPDH refined its rock format. In 1978, SPK went to an unusual CHR/oldies hybrid called "Gold N' Stereo" combining music by Sugarhill Gang, Neil Diamond, The Who, Abba, Free, Prince, and the Monkees. The station itself evolved to a more pure CHR "hit music" format from 1980 through 1981.

K104 history
In 1979, Stew Schantz (who also had worked stints at WPDH, later WSPK program director) re-worked the station's image, branding it "K-104". Schantz and the station's sales manager, Chuck Stewart, picked up the idea from a sales conference out west (there, station call signs usually begin with a "K" where east of the Mississippi River they usually begin with a "W"). The new name worked wonders for a station which had spent the previous decade adrift. Stew returned to mornings at WPDH, but he would later return again to K-104 in the late 1980s. Jim Simonetti was WSPK's first PD in its new incarnation as an Adult Top 40 calling itself K-104. He would later transfer to Beacon Broadcasting's WSCR in Scranton, Pennsylvania. Chris Leide would succeed him as PD until 1989, when afternoon host Sean Phillips would become PD until 1992. Mark Bolger, currently at WCZX (MIX 97FM), joined K104. As a later evening DJ, Bolger was nicknamed as "The Bolge" from 1985 to 1988. He then handled the K-104 morning drive as "Mark Bolger in the Morning on K104" until 1996. Mark Bolger's "Record Crusher" segment, a test play on new hit records, was a notable trademark of his evening show. Nick Robbins also rocked the Hudson valley in K104s early Rock of the Hudson Days, Stew Schantz re-joined K-104 in 1988 after leaving the "Stew and John Morning Show" at WPDH, initially handling the afternoon drive before eventually moving into the midday slot. The "All-Request Lunch at Noon with Stew Schantz" also debuted, with Scotty Mac as the current host as the "All-Request Lunch at Noon with Scotty Mac". Scotty joined the station in 1989 originally handling voiceover and commercial production work with weekend host (and later MD) Chris St. James. With the exception of one year being at KHITS Tulsa, OK in 1998, Scotty Mac is the longest tenured air personality at the station, and is currently midday host and PD.

By the early 1990s, K-104 evolved to a more adult-leaning approach as the CHR format went into a short-term decline.  The decline was mainly due to country music's resurgence immediately following the Persian Gulf War. With this, the numbers weakened even though there was no real competition for its target audience. In 1996, owner Beacon Broadcasting sold their remaining stations Enterprise Media of Binghamton. Under this new ownership, Mark Bolger left the station, and Stew Schantz handled the K-104 morning drive. Their ownership was short lived, as they in turn sold WBNR and WSPK to Pamal Broadcasting in 1998.  Upon Pamal's take over, Schantz resigned from the station. He later went on to do behind-the-scenes work in Utica, Albany and Pittsfield, Massachusetts. Schantz died in June, 2010.  The sale to Pamal ended K-104's running of weekend shows such as Open House Party with John Garabedian, Classic Dance Tracks with Stevie T, as well as the K-104 Hometown Countdown.

After Schantz's departure, Brian Krysz took on the program director's responsibilities and hired Kent Bonham ("Woodman") to handle the K-104 morning drive. Krysz programmed the station until May 1999, when Scotty Mac (formerly nights in 1991) took over. The changes led to a re-imaged CHR approach which leaned towards dance music. The station's ratings improved, regaining top position in many key demographics, as well as the 12+ bragging rights. Though in recent years weak competition has come in the form of WPKF and the station is a perennial #1, K-104 is still a dominant force in the Hudson Valley radio markets. K-104 also has the distinction as being the oldest FM 24/7 top 40 station in continuous operation in the United States, as this station pioneered such format on the FM radio dial. Other radio stations in the country including WPLJ, WHTZ (Z-100), KISS 108 (WXKS-FM) Boston and KIIS-FM Los Angeles, would later evolve and emulate into similar 24/7 radio formats. The late Stew Schantz is considered a pioneer in establishing this type of radio format, as he is listed as one of the notable program directors and disk jockeys in the Rock and Roll Hall of Fame (alongside Alan Freed, Dick Clark, Casey Kasem and many others, local and national). Jarrett "Skywalker" Galeno joined K-104 in 2000, from WBLI-FM. Holding down assistant program director responsibilities, he also hosts afternoon drive.

Kent "Woodman" Bonham originally hosted the K-104 morning show from 1998 to 2006. Upon his exit, Chris Marino took the helm from 2006 until 2009 when Kent "Woodman" Bonham returned. Woodman has continued to host mornings ever since. The current morning line-up features co-host Jill, long-time morning news voice and K-104 personality, Bill Beale, and a diverse cast of characters.

K-104 is known for its use of voice-over veteran Mark Driscoll as the station's voice from 1994 to the end of 1997 and from 1999 through today.  Before Driscoll the legendary Mitch Craig was the voice guy.

K-104 is the Top 40 radio station in the United States whose terrestrial radio is broadcast over more states than any other Top 40 station in the country and currently can be heard in New York, New Jersey, Connecticut, Massachusetts, Pennsylvania, and Vermont.

K107
In early 2003, Pamal Broadcasting purchased WYNY (107.1 MHz), the Westchester County portion of the "Y-107/Rhumba 107.1" "quadcast" from Nassau Broadcasting (which itself had bought all four stations from Big City Radio). On April 9 of that year, WYNY took on the WXPK calls and the stations relaunched as "K-104 and K-107".  Due to various problems keeping the station on the air and generating revenue with the Westchester signal, the simulcast ended one year later when the 107.1 frequency changed to adult album alternative as "107.1 The Peak".

KFEST
WSPK holds a yearly event known as K*Fest; for more information see K Fest (Radio). In 2007, rapper Akon threw a boy off the stage into the crowd, an event which attracted media attention. As of November 29, 2007 charges have been filed against Akon regarding this incident. Charges include, Endangering the Welfare of a Minor, a misdemeanor and second-degree harassment.

The K104.7 Christmas Wish
Every Holiday Season K104.7 conducts an event, The 12 Days Of Christmas wish. Where Listeners have the chance to write about someone they know who has had a rough time through the year and they are given the chance to write a letter and are able to earn the family they are writing about a chance to have a magical holiday season with the 12 days of Christmas wish giving that family a $500 gift certificate to one of the area malls.

Current on-air personalities
 Kent "Woodman" Bonham - (1998-2006; 2009–present)
 Bill Beale - (2002–present)
 Jill
 Diva
 Scotty Mac - (1989–present) Program Director
 Skywalker - (2000–present) Asst. Program Director
 Paulie Feva - Music Director
 Jeremiah

Part-time/Swing personalities
 Tony Flash
 Erich Bachman
 Cindy V.
 Alan Velazquez (Alvalez)
 Jimmy Lyles
 Jenna G.
 Will Love

Mix DJ's
 DJ Ra-Vee "The General"
 DJ Mr. Vince
 Miss Deezy
 David Barese
 Mike Hagg
 Tommy Nappi

Former notable on-air personalities
 Stew Schantz
 Mark Bolger
 Dawn Spicer
 Chris St. James
 Dr. John Barron
 Donnie Michaels
 John Foxx
 Paulie Cruz
 Phill Kross
 Lynn Kelly
 Danny Valentino
 Jack Hammer
 Andre Kane
 Annie
 Ray Myers
 Jeff Jensen; currently overnight traffic reporter on 1010WINS & WCBS 880 in NYC

References

External links 
 Station homepage
 WSPK @ Facebook
 

SPK
Radio stations established in 1947
Contemporary hit radio stations in the United States
1947 establishments in New York (state)
Pamal Broadcasting